Bisi Adeleye-Fayemi (born 11 June 1963) is a Nigerian-British feminist activist, writer and policy advocate. She was first lady of Ekiti State, Nigeria as wife of Ekiti State governor Kayode Fayemi from 2018 to 2022. She previously served as first lady from 2010 to 2014 during her husband's first term in office. In 2001, she co-founded the African Women's Development Fund (AWDF), the first Pan-African grant-making organisation. She serves as a UN Women Nigeria Senior Advisor, and was appointed as a Visiting Senior Research Fellow at King's College, University of London in 2017. She is CEO of Above Whispers Limited, and runs an online community called Abovewhispers.com.

When her husband Dr. Kayode Fayemi took office as Governor of Ekiti State, Nigeria, she became actively involved in a range of policy advocacy, grassroots empowerment and social inclusion programs in Ekiti State. She led the campaign to enact a Gender Based Violence Prohibition Law (2011, revised in October 2019), an Equal Opportunities Bill (2013) and an HIV Anti-Stigma Bill (2014). She continues to work on the implementation and sustainability of these initiatives as First Lady of Ekiti State for the second time.

She serves on the Executive Boards of the African Women's Development Fund. She is Chair of the Advisory Council of the Nigerian Women's Trust Fund and also serves on the Governing Council of Elizade University in Nigeria. She is currently Chair of the Gender Based Violence Law Management Committee, Ekiti State and Chair, Ekiti State AIDS Control Agency.
She is also on the Steering Committee of the Regional African Women Leaders Network (AWLN) and a member of AWLN-Nigeria Steering Steering Committee where she serves as an Adviser.

Adeleye-Fayemi is the author of Loud Whispers (2017), Speaking for Myself (2013), and an autobiography entitled Speaking above a Whisper (2013). She also co-edited Voice, Power and Soul.

Education
Bisi Adeleye-Fayemi was born in Liverpool, England, on 11 June 1963. She received her bachelor's and master's degrees in history from the University of Ife, now the Obafemi Awolowo University, Nigeria.  She also received an MA in Gender and Society (1992) from Middlesex University, UK.  She is currently CEO, Above Whispers Limited, specializing in leadership development for women, and she runs an online community called Abovewhispers.com, where she writes a weekly column called "Loud Whispers". She was until recently a UN Women Nigeria Senior Advisor, and was recently appointed as a Visiting Senior Research Fellow at King's College, University of London.

Career
She served as the Director of Akina Mama wa Afrika (AMwA), an international development organisation for African women, based in London, UK, from 1991 to 2001 as well as Executive Director of the African Women's Development Fund (AWDF), the first Africa-wide grant-making fund which supports the work of organisations promoting women's rights in Africa, from 2001 to 2010.

During her years in the UK, Bisi Fayemi worked in the Department of Health as an Administrative Officer. She then became the Director of Akina Mama wa Afrika (AMwA), an international development organisation for African women based in London, UK, with an Africa regional office in Kampala, Uganda, from 1991 to 2001. While she was the Director of AMwA, she established the African Women's Leadership Institute (AWLI), a training and networking forum for young African women. The leadership institute she developed has become such a powerful legacy that today the AWLI has trained more than 6,000 women across Africa, most of whom are now in senior decision-making positions as Ministers, Members of Parliaments, academics, civil society leaders and employees of international organisations.

Adeleye-Fayemi has been associated with a number of international women's rights and philanthropy organisations, including as co-chair of the International Network of Women's Funds, president of the Association for Women's Rights in Development (AWID), and chair of the International Women's Health Coalition (IWHC). She has also been on the board of trustees for Comic Relief (UK).

Leymah Gbowee of Liberia, 2011 Nobel Peace Prize winner, delivered Adeleye-Fayemi's 50th birthday lecture in 2013. Titled "Leading the Change: The Journey of an African Woman", the lecture detailed how Adeleye-Fayemi's support was foundational to Gbowee's work in Liberia, eventually leading to her Nobel Prize. Gbowee talked about how Adeleye-Fayemi, as head of AWDF, had supported the women's peace movement in Liberia in its infancy, saying: "We crave change, but wait for someone to come and save us. Most times, our reluctance to creating change and acting accordingly means that we don't change perception about us. But, Bisi, you have helped us to achieve change. You have used your position to sew dreams and show that change is possible, and helped to set our minds to it. That I won the Nobel Prize is because of people like you. That day, you didn't see me. You saw a sister. Today, we say, 'Thank you'. You have helped to set our minds to it."

Personal life
She is married to Kayode Fayemi, who went on to become Governor of Ekiti State in 2010, and again in 2018; they met while they were students, and they have one son together, Folajimi Fayemi (born 1994).

Awards and recognition
Adeleye-Fayemi was given the "Changing the Face of Philanthropy" award by the Women's Funding Network in 2007, and was named one of the 20 most influential African women in 2009 by New African magazine. In 2011, Women Deliver listed her as one of the top 100 people in the world, advancing the rights of women and girls.

In 2019, she was awarded the 2018 Zik Leadership Prize for humanitarian Leadership by Public Policy Research and Analysis Centre (PPRAC).

Selected publications
 2020 Where Is Your Wrapper?
 2017 Loud Whispers
 2013 Speaking Above A Whisper
 2013 Speaking For Myself
 2008 Voice, Power and Soul (co-edited with Jessica Horn)

References

External links

 "Know Your African Feminists: Bisi Adeleye Fayemi". 4th African Feminist Forum Interview Series, April 2016, Harare, Zimbabwe. YouTube.
  The African Women Leaders Network (AWLN) at the 44th Session of the Commission on Population and Development
  Nigerian Women Leaders call for more involvement of women to promote peaceful elections 

  Fayemi's wife wins Zik leadership award
  Erelu Fayemi, two governors, former Ghanaian President win Zik leadership prize
  Mrs. Fayemi receives Zik Prize award

Living people
Alumni of Middlesex University
Obafemi Awolowo University alumni
1963 births
Nigerian women activists
Nigerian women writers
Nigerian feminists
Nigerian philanthropists
Yoruba women writers